Semisulcospira ourense is a species of freshwater snail with an operculum, an aquatic gastropod mollusk in the family Semisulcospiridae.

Distribution 
This species occurs in the Lake Biwa, Japan.

References

Semisulcospiridae